Mik Thongraya (born 28 November 1992) is a Thai actor and model. Currently, he is signed under Channel 7.

Personal life 
Thongraya is of Danish and Thai descent. He graduated from Ramkhamhaeng University. In 2018, he enlisted in the Royal Thai Air Force at Saraburi his birthplace.

Career 
Thongraya began his career by joining the "Dream Star Search" in 2008, winning the best new actor award. In 2010, he debuted in the drama Team Zah Tah Fun in a supporting role. After that, he acted in several dramas in supporting and main roles. In 2016, he was paired up with Stephany Auernig in the drama Fire Series: Talay Fai and with Pimprapa Tangprabhaporn in the drama Karn La Krang Neung Nai Hua Jai. Since then he has only played lead roles, mostly in dramas for Channel 7. He starred in Mussaya, where he paired up with Mookda Narinrak, and Paragit Ruk: Yuet Fah Ha Pigat Ruk, where he reunited with Stephany Auernig.

Filmography

Film

Television series

MC
 Television 
 20 :

 Online 
 2022 : มากับมิกค์ EP.1 On Air YouTube:มากับมิกค์

Discography

Soundtrack appearances

Advertising

Awards and nominations

References

External links 
 Mik Thongraya on Channel 7
 
 

1992 births
Living people
Mick Tongraya
Mick Tongraya
Mick Tongraya
Mick Tongraya
Mick Tongraya
Mick Tongraya
Mick Tongraya
Thai television personalities
Mick Tongraya